Duncan Browne is the self-titled second studio album by English singer-songwriter and musician Duncan Browne, released in 1973 through Mickie Most's Rak Records. Stylistically, the album is a continuation of Browne's folk-indebted debut album, Give Me Take You (1968), and features progressive rock and electronic music elements.

The album spawned the Bob Dylan-inspired hit single "Journey", which peaked at number 23 on the UK Singles Chart. Nevertheless, both the album and the single were considered commercially unsuccessful for a follow-up recording, which prompted Browne to spend the next several years as a session musician. Since then, the album has garnered a cult following among folk rock fans and is now considered a "lost classic" from the era.

Duncan Browne was reissued by EMI in 2002, with four additional bonus tracks.

Critical reception

AllMusic critic Bruce Eder praised the album, stating: "Even overlooking its own intrinsic merits, Duncan Browne is worth owning as a more mature and developed, if slightly less spontaneous, expression of the sensibilities that forged Give Me Take You."

Track listing

Personnel
Album personnel as adapted from album liner notes.
 Duncan Browne – vocals, guitar, flamenco guitar, arrangement
 Mickie Most – production, arrangement
 Jim Rodford – bass guitar
 Robert Henrit – drums 
 John "Rabbit" Bundrick – organ, synthesizer, piano, keyboards 
 John Cameron – piano, keyboards
 Keith Hodge – additional vocals
 Suzi Quatro – additional vocals 
 Tony Carr – additional vocals

Chart positions
Singles

References

External links
 

1973 albums
Rak Records albums
Duncan Browne albums
Albums produced by Mickie Most